Black dragonfish is a common name for several fish and may refer to the listed fish that appear underneath. These fish are the:

 
 Idiacanthus atlanticus, a barbeled dragonfish of the family Stomiidae
 Idiacanthus fasciola